Vytautas (c. 1350–1430) was a Lithuanian medieval king, Grand Duke, Prince of Hrodna and Prince of Lutsk.

Vytautas may also refer to:
Vitas, a diminutive form of the given name
Vytautas Magnus University, a public university in Kaunas, Lithuania founded in 1922 
Vytautas the Great Bridge, a bridge in Kaunas, Lithuania that crosses the Nemunas River 
Vytautas' the Great Church, a Roman Catholic church in Kaunas, Lithuania consecrated in 1400
Vytautas the Great War Museum, a museum in Kaunas, Lithuania opened in 1936
BC Vytautas, basketball team from Prienai, Lithuania

People with the given name
Vytautas Andriuškevičius (born 1990), Lithuanian footballer 
Vytautas Apanavičius (born 1973), Lithuanian football midfielder
Vytautas Babravičius or Simas (born 1952), Lithuanian country and folk rock musician
Vytautas Bacevičius (1905–1970), Lithuanian composer
Vytautas Barkauskas (born 1931), Lithuanian composer and music educator
Vytautas Beliajus (1908-1994), Lithuanian folk dancer and instructor
Vytautas Pranas Bičiūnas (1893–1943), Lithuanian painter, theatre actor, writer and literary critic
Vytautas Briedis (born 1940), Lithuanian rower and Olympic medalist
Vytautas Bubnys (1932–2021), Lithuanian writer and politician
Vytautas Bulvičius (1908–1941), Lithuanian military officer, major of the General Staff, and leader of the anti-Soviet Lithuanian Activist Front (LAF)
Vytautas Butkus (born 1949), Lithuanian rower and Olympic medalist
Vytautas Čekanauskas (1930–2010), Lithuanian architect 
Vytautas Černiauskas (born 1989), Lithuanian football goalkeeper
Vytautas "Vitas" Gerulaitis (1954–1994), American tennis player
Vytautas Andrius Graičiūnas (1898–1952), Lithuanian management theorist, management consultant and engineer
Vytautas Janulionis (1958–2010), Lithuanian glass artist
Vytautas Janušaitis (born 1981), Lithuanian swimmer and Olympic competitor
Vytautas Kazimieras Jonynas (1907–1997), Lithuanian artist, sculptor, illustrator and furniture designer
Vytautas Juozapaitis (born 1963), Lithuanian singer
Vytautas Kavolis (1930–1996), Lithuanian/American sociologist, literary critic and historian
Vytautas Kernagis (1951–2008), Lithuanian singer-songwriter, bard, actor, director and television announcer
Vytautas Klova (1926–2009), Lithuanian composer and educator
Vytautas Kolesnikovas (born 1948), Lithuanian painter, graphic artist and politician
Vytautas Kubilius (1928—2004), Lithuanian literary critic and political activist
Vytautas Lalas (born 1982), Lithuanian professional strongman competitor 
Vytautas Landsbergis (born 1932), Lithuanian politician and parliamentarian
Vytautas Lukša (born 1984), Lithuanian footballer 
Vytautas Mačernis (1921–1944), Lithuanian existentialist poet
Vytautas Mažiulis (1926-2009), Lithuanian linguist
Vytautas Merkys (1929-2012), Lithuanian historian
Vytautas Miškinis (born 1954), Lithuanian composer and conductor
Vytautas Montvila (1935–2003), Lithuanian composer, bassoonist and sound engineer
Vytautas Paliūnas (born 1930), Lithuanian politician
Vytautas Petrulis (1890-1942), Lithuanian politician, former Prime Minister of Lithuania
Vytautas Petras Plečkaitis (born 1950), Lithuanian politician
Vytautas Pociūnas (1957-2006), Lithuanian physicist, politician and diplomat
Vytautas Adolfas Puplauskas (born 1930), Lithuanian politician
Vytautas Sakalauskas (1933–2001), Lithuanian Soviet politician
Vytautas Stanionis (1917-1966), Lithuanian photographer 
Vytautas Straižys (born 1936), Lithuanian astronomer
Vytautas Šulskis (born 1988), Lithuanian basketball player
Vytautas Šustauskas (born 1945), Lithuanian politician
Vytautas Vaičikonis, Lithuanian sprint canoeist
Vytautas Valius (1930–2004), Lithuanian painter and graphic designer 
Vytautas Vičiulis (1951–1989), Lithuanian painter, antiques restorer and anti-Soviet protester
Vytautas Žalakevičius (1930-1996), Lithuanian film director and writer

Lithuanian masculine given names